Thrissacanthias are a genus of sea stars in the family Astropectinidae in the order Paxillosida.

Species
Thrissacanthias penicillatus

References 

Astropectinidae